Hibbett Sports, Inc. is an American publicly traded holding company for Hibbett Sporting Goods, a full line sporting goods retailer headquartered in Birmingham, Alabama. As of January 29, 2022, the company operated approximately 1,096 retail stores, which include 900 Hibbett Sports stores, 179 City Gear stores, and 17 Sports Additions athletic shoe stores in 35 states. Hibbett Sports, Inc. operates sporting goods stores in small to mid-sized markets, in the Southeast, Southwest and lower Midwest regions of the United States. States with the most stores are Georgia (97), Texas (97), and Alabama (90).  Its stores offer a range of athletic equipment, footwear and apparel. The company's primary store format is the Hibbett Sports store, an approximately 5,000 square foot store located primarily in strip centers which are frequently influenced by a Wal-Mart store.

History 
In January 2015, Hibbett Sports reported net annual sales of US$913M on total assets of US$452M.

In August 2017, the company announced the launch of its new e-commerce site, hibbett.com. The website includes product launch calendars, a store availability finder, and fit-finding technology.

References

Companies based in Birmingham, Alabama
Economy of the Midwestern United States
Economy of the Southeastern United States
Economy of the Southwestern United States
Sporting goods retailers of the United States
Companies listed on the Nasdaq
Retail companies established in 1945
1945 establishments in Alabama